Hunspach is a commune in the Bas-Rhin department in Grand Est in north-eastern France. In 2020 it was voted the «Village préféré des Français» (France's favourite village).

Geography
The commune lies a short distance to the south of Wissembourg  within the Northern Vosges Regional Nature Park.

Sights
The village is a member of the Les Plus Beaux Villages de France ("The most beautiful villages of France") association.

Hunspach has retained much of its traditional architecture. The houses are white and in the Alsatian half timbered style. Open central yards offer glimpses of the working farms within.

Photo gallery

See also
 Ouvrage Schoenenbourg
 Communes of the Bas-Rhin department

References

Communes of Bas-Rhin
Bas-Rhin communes articles needing translation from French Wikipedia
Plus Beaux Villages de France